Kelly Geraghty (born 11 July 1977) is an Australian synchronized swimmer who competed in the 2000 Summer Olympics.

References

1977 births
Living people
Australian synchronised swimmers
Olympic synchronised swimmers of Australia
Synchronized swimmers at the 2000 Summer Olympics